Rajesh Bhudia (born 22 November 1984) is a former Kenyan cricketer. He was part of their 15-man squad for the 2007 Cricket World Cup. He did not play any cricket since 2012.

External links

1984 births
Living people
People from Bhuj
Indian emigrants to Kenya
Kenyan people of Indian descent
Kenyan cricketers
Kenya One Day International cricketers
Kenya Twenty20 International cricketers
Kenyan people of Gujarati descent
Southern Stars cricketers